Cristian Correa may refer to:

 Cristian Correa (footballer, born 1985), Colombian midfielder
 Cristian Correa (footballer, born 1991), Argentine goalkeeper